The freguesias (civil parishes) of Portugal are listed in by municipality according to the following format:
 concelho
 freguesias

Mação
Aboboreira
Amêndoa
Cardigos
Carvoeiro
Envendos
Mação
Ortiga
Penhascoso

Macedo de Cavaleiros
Ala
Amendoeira
Arcas
Bagueixe
Bornes
Burga
Carrapatas
Castelãos
Chacim
Cortiços
Corujas
Edroso
Espadanedo
Ferreira
Grijó de Vale Benfeito
Lagoa
Lamalonga
Lamas de Podence
Lombo
Macedo de Cavaleiros
Morais
Murçós
Olmos
Peredo
Podence
Salselas
Santa Combinha
Sesulfe
Soutelo Mourisco
Talhas
Talhinhas
Vale Benfeito
Vale da Porca
Vale de Prados
Vilar do Monte
Vilarinho de Agrochão
Vilarinho do Monte
Vinhas

Machico (Madeira)
Água de Pena
Caniçal
Machico
Porto da Cruz
Santo António da Serra

Madalena (Azores)
Bandeiras
Candelária
Criação Velha
Madalena
São Caetano
São Mateus

Mafra
Azueira
Carvoeira
Cheleiros
Encarnação
Enxara do Bispo
Ericeira
Gradil
Igreja Nova
Mafra
Malveira
Milharado
Santo Estêvão das Galés
Santo Isidoro
São Miguel de Alcainça
Sobral da Abelheira
Venda do Pinheiro
Vila Franca do Rosário

Maia
Águas Santas
Avioso (Santa Maria)
Avioso (São Pedro)
Barca
Folgosa
Gemunde
Gondim
Gueifães
Maia
Milheirós
Moreira
Nogueira
Pedrouços
São Pedro Fins
Silva Escura
Vermoim
Vila Nova da Telha

Mangualde
Abrunhosa-a-Velha
Alcafache
Chãs de Tavares
Cunha Alta
Cunha Baixa
Espinho
Fornos de Maceira Dão
Freixiosa
Lobelhe do Mato
Mangualde
Mesquitela
Moimenta de Maceira Dão
Póvoa de Cervães
Quintela de Azurara
Santiago de Cassurrães
São João da Fresta
Travanca de Tavares
Várzea de Tavares

Manteigas
Manteigas (Santa Maria)
Manteigas (São Pedro)
Sameiro
Vale de Amoreira

Marco de Canaveses
Alpendurada e Matos
Ariz
Avessadas
Banho e Carvalhosa
Constance (Portugal)
Favões
Folhada
Fornos
Freixo
Magrelos
Manhuncelos
Maureles
Paços de Gaiolo
Paredes de Viadores
Penha Longa
Rio de Galinhas
Rosem
Sande
Santo Isidoro
São Lourenço do Douro
São Nicolau
Soalhães
Sobretâmega
Tabuado
Torrão
Toutosa
Tuias
Várzea da Ovelha e Aliviada
Várzea do Douro
Vila Boa de Quires
Vila Boa do Bispo

Marinha Grande
Marinha Grande
Moita
Vieira de Leiria

Marvão
Beirã
Santa Maria de Marvão
Santo António das Areias
São Salvador da Aramenha

Matosinhos
Custóias
Guifões
Lavra
Leça da Palmeira
Leça do Balio
Matosinhos
Perafita, Matosinhos
Santa Cruz do Bispo
São Mamede de Infesta
Senhora da Hora

Mealhada
Antes
Barcouço
Casal Comba
Luso
Mealhada
Pampilhosa
Vacariça
Ventosa do Bairro

Mêda
Aveloso
Barreira
Carvalhal
Casteição
Coriscada
Fonte Longa
Longroiva
Marialva
Meda
Outeiro de Gatos
Pai Penela
Poço do Canto
Prova
Rabaçal
Ranhados
Vale Flor

Melgaço
Alvaredo
Castro Laboreiro
Chaviães
Cousso
Cristoval
Cubalhão
Fiães
Gave
Lamas de Mouro
Paços
Paderne
Parada do Monte
Penso
Prado
Remoães
Roussas
São Paio
Vila

Mértola
Alcaria Ruiva
Corte do Pinto
Espírito Santo
Mértola
Santana de Cambas
São João dos Caldeireiros
São Miguel do Pinheiro
São Pedro de Solis
São Sebastião dos Carros

Mesão Frio
Barqueiros
Cidadelhe
Mesão Frio (Santa Cristina)
Mesão Frio (São Nicolau)
Oliveira
Vila Jusã
Vila Marim

Mira
Carapelhos
Mira
Praia de Mira
Seixo

Miranda do Corvo
Lamas
Miranda do Corvo
Rio Vide
Semide
Vila Nova

Miranda do Douro
Águas Vivas
Atenor
Cicouro
Constantim
Duas Igrejas
Genísio
Ifanes
Malhadas
Miranda do Douro
Palaçoulo
Paradela
Picote
Póvoa
São Martinho de Angueira
Sendim
Silva
Vila Chã de Braciosa

Mirandela
Abambres
Abreiro
Aguieiras
Alvites
Avantos
Avidagos
Barcel
Bouça
Cabanelas
Caravelas
Carvalhais
Cedães
Cobro
Fradizela
Franco
Frechas
Freixeda
Lamas de Orelhão
Marmelos
Mascarenhas
Mirandela
Múrias
Navalho
Passos
Pereira
Romeu
São Pedro Velho
São Salvador
Suçães
Torre de Dona Chama
Vale de Asnes
Vale de Gouvinhas
Vale de Salgueiro
Vale de Telhas
Valverde, Mirandela
Vila Boa
Vila Verde

Mogadouro
Azinhoso
Bemposta
Bruçó
Brunhoso
Brunhozinho
Castanheira
Castelo Branco
Castro Vicente
Meirinhos
Mogadouro
Paradela
Penas Roias
Peredo da Bemposta
Remondes
Saldanha
Sanhoane
São Martinho do Peso
Soutelo
Tó (Portugal)
Travanca
Urrós
Vale da Madre
Vale de Porco
Valverde, Mogadouro
Ventozelo
Vila de Ala
Vilar de Rei
Vilarinho dos Galegos

Moimenta da Beira
Aldeia de Nacomba
Alvite
Arcozelos
Ariz
Baldos
Cabaços
Caria
Castelo
Leomil
Moimenta da Beira
Nagosa
Paradinha
Passô
Pêra Velha
Peva
Rua
Sarzedo
Segões
Sever
Vilar

Moita
Alhos Vedros
Baixa da Banheira
Gaio-Rosário
Moita
Sarilhos Pequenos
Vale da Amoreira

Monção
Abedim
Anhões
Badim
Barbeita
Barroças e Taias
Bela
Cambeses
Ceivães
Cortes
Lapela
Lara
Longos Vales

Luzio
Mazedo
Merufe
Messegães
Monção
Moreira
Parada
Pias
Pinheiros
Podame
Portela
Riba de Mouro
Sá
Sago
Segude
Tangil
Troporiz
Troviscoso
Trute
Valadares

Monchique
Alferce
Marmelete
Monchique

Mondim de Basto
Atei
Bilhó
Campanhó
Ermelo
Mondim de Basto
Paradança
Pardelhas
Vilar de Ferreiros

Monforte
Assumar
Monforte
Santo Aleixo
Vaiamonte

Montalegre
Cabril
Cambeses do Rio
Cervos
Chã
Contim
Covelães
Covelo do Gerês
Donões
Ferral
Fervidelas
Fiães do Rio
Gralhas
Meixedo
Meixide
Montalegre
Morgade
Mourilhe
Negrões
Outeiro
Padornelos
Padroso
Paradela
Pitões das Junias
Pondras
Reigoso
Salto
Santo André
Sarraquinhos
Sezelhe
Solveira
Tourém
Venda Nova
Viade de Baixo
Vila da Ponte
Vilar de Perdizes (São Miguel)

Montemor-o-Novo
Cabrela
Ciborro
Cortiçadas
Foros de Vale de Figueira
Lavre
Nossa Senhora da Vila
Nossa Senhora do Bispo
Santiago do Escoural
São Cristóvão
Silveiras

Montemor-o-Velho
Abrunheira
Arazede
Carapinheira
Ereira
Gatões
Liceia
Meãs do Campo
Montemor-o-Velho
Pereira
Santo Varão
Seixo de Gatões
Tentúgal
Verride
Vila Nova da Barca

Montijo
Afonsoeiro
Alto-Estanqueiro-Jardia
Atalaia
Canha
Montijo
Pegões
Santo Isidro de Pegões
Sarilhos Grandes

Mora
Brotas
Cabeção
Mora
Pavia

Mortágua
Almaça
Cercosa
Cortegaça
Espinho
Marmeleira
Mortágua
Pala
Sobral
Trezói
Vale de Remígio

Moura
Amareleja
Moura (Santo Agostinho)
Moura (São João Baptista)
Póvoa de São Miguel
Safara
Santo Aleixo da Restauração
Santo Amador
Sobral da Adiça

Mourão
Granja
Luz
Mourão

Murça
Candedo
Carva
Fiolhoso
Jou
Murça
Noura
Palheiros
Valongo de Milhais
Vilares

Murtosa
Bunheiro
Monte
Murtosa
Torreira

M